Peedla Wetland Complex is a wetland complex in Lääne-Viru County, Estonia. This complex is one of the biggest wetland massive in Estonia.

The area of the complex is 15,500 ha.

References

Lääne-Viru County
Bogs of Estonia